Snoop Dogg Presents: Dubb Union is the debut album by American hip hop group Dubb Union. It was released on August 19, 2008 via Koch Records. Production was handled by member Soopafly, Hi-Tek, Nominz, Chris "THX" Goodman, J-Doe, Ronald "Jukebox" Jackson, Teddy Riley and Warryn "Baby Dubb" Campbell, with Snoop Dogg serving as executive producer. It features guest appearances from BJ the Chicago Kid, Dion Jenkins, Daz Dillinger, Kurupt, Minister Tony Muhammad, Snoop Dogg, Traci Nelson and Uncle Chucc. The album peaked at number 85 on the Top R&B/Hip-Hop Albums chart in the United States.

Track listing

Sample credits
Track 13 contains a sample of the recording "Good Old Funky Music" by The Meters

Personnel

Priest "Soopafly" Brooks – main artist, keyboards (tracks: 1, 4-7, 11, 15), strings (track 10), producer (tracks: 1, 4, 5, 7, 11, 15), co-producer (track 6), recording (tracks: 4, 7, 8, 10, 11, 14, 15), mixing (tracks: 1, 2, 4-7, 10-15)
Damani Nkosi Washington – main artist
Terence "Bad Lucc" Harden – main artist
Bryan "BJ the Chicago Kid" Sledge – featured artist (tracks: 2, 4, 10, 14)
Delmar "Daz Dillinger" Arnaud – featured artist (track 4)
Calvin "Snoop Dogg" Broadus – featured artist (track 5), executive producer
Dion Jenkins – featured artist (tracks: 6, 12)
Minister Tony Muhammad – featured artist (track 9)
Ricardo "Kurupt" Brown – featured artist (track 13)
Traci Nelson – featured artist (track 13)
Charles "Uncle Chucc" Hamilton – featured artist (track 15)
Robert "Bubby" Smith – bass (track 10)
James "J-Doe" Smith – producer (track 2)
Warryn "Baby Dubb" Campbell – producer (track 3)
Tony "Hi-Tek" Cottrell – producer (tracks: 6, 12)
Ronald "Jukebox" Jackson – producer (track 8)
Teddy Riley – producer & mixing (track 8)
James "Nominz" Amankwa – producer (tracks: 10, 14)
Chris "THX" Goodman – producer (track 13)
"Shon Don" Dornae Brooks – recording (tracks: 1, 2, 5, 12, 13)
Bruce Buechner – recording (tracks: 3, 7), mixing (track 3)
Dave Aron – mixing (tracks: 1, 2, 5-7, 10-15)
Lamar "DJ Crazy Toones" Calhoun – arranger
Andrew Mezzi – mixing assistant (tracks: 1, 2, 5-7, 10-15)
David "Dizmix" Lopez – mastering
Andrew Kelley – art direction, design
Nykauni "Nkki" Tademy – A&R

Charts

References

External links

E1 Music albums
2008 debut albums
Dubb Union albums
Albums produced by Hi-Tek
Albums produced by Soopafly
Albums produced by Teddy Riley
Albums produced by Warryn Campbell